Suffolk County is located in the Commonwealth of Massachusetts, in the United States. As of the 2020 census, the population was 797,936, making it the fourth-most populous county in Massachusetts. The county comprises the cities of Boston, Chelsea, Revere, and Winthrop. The traditional county seat is Boston, the state capital and the largest city in Massachusetts. The county government was abolished in 1999, and so Suffolk County today functions only as an administrative subdivision of state government and a set of communities grouped together for some statistical purposes. Suffolk County is located at the core of the Boston-Cambridge-Newton, MA-NH Metropolitan Statistical Area as well as the greater Boston-Worcester-Providence, MA-RI-NH-CT Combined Statistical Area.

History

The county was created by the Massachusetts General Court on May 10, 1643, when it was ordered "that the whole plantation within this jurisdiction be divided into four shires". Suffolk initially contained Boston, Roxbury, Dorchester, Dedham, Braintree, Weymouth, and Hingham. The county was named after Suffolk, England, which means "southern folk."

In 1731, the extreme western portions of Suffolk County, which included Mendon and Uxbridge, were split off to become part of Worcester County. In 1793, most of the original Suffolk County (including Milton) except for Boston, Chelsea, Hingham, and Hull (which remained in Suffolk) split off and became Norfolk County. Hingham and Hull would leave Suffolk County and join Plymouth County in 1803. Revere was set off from Chelsea and incorporated in 1846 and Winthrop was set off from Revere and incorporated in 1852. In the late 19th century and early 20th century, Boston annexed several adjacent cities and towns including Hyde Park, Roxbury, West Roxbury, and Dorchester from Norfolk County and Charlestown and Brighton from Middlesex County, resulting in an enlargement of Suffolk County.

Government and politics
Like an increasing number of Massachusetts counties, Suffolk County exists today only as a historical geographic region, and has no county government. All former county functions were assumed by state agencies in 1999. The sheriff, district attorney, and some other regional officials with specific duties are still elected locally to perform duties within the county region, but there is no county council, executives or commissioners. Prior to the abolition of county government, the authority of the Suffolk County Commission had for many years been exercised by the Boston City Council, even though three communities in the county are not part of the city. However, communities are now granted the right to form their own regional compacts for sharing services.

Politically speaking, Suffolk County supports the Democratic Party overwhelmingly. No Republican presidential candidate has won there since Calvin Coolidge in 1924. In 2012 Barack Obama received 77.4% of the vote, compared to 20.8% for former governor of Massachusetts Mitt Romney. In the 2014 gubernatorial election, Martha Coakley carried the county by a 32.4% margin, while losing the election statewide by 48.4 to 46.5%. In 2020, Joe Biden won the county by the largest margin of any presidential candidate since Lyndon B. Johnson in 1964, and was the first candidate since then to win more than 80% of the vote in the county.

|}

Law enforcement
The Suffolk County Sheriff's Department's primary responsibility is oversight of the Nashua Street Jail and the South Bay House of Correction. These were built in the 1990s to replace the historic Charles Street Jail and Deer Island Prison, respectively. The Suffolk County Sheriff's Department was among those named in a 2020 WBUR report about the neglect of inmates with medical conditions in Massachusetts prisons leading to their deaths.

Several notable figures in Massachusetts history were once the sheriff of Suffolk County:

Joseph Hall (1818–1825)
Charles Pinckney Sumner (1825–1839)
John M. Clark (1855–1883)
John A. Keliher (1917–1938)
John F. Dowd (1938–1939)
Frederick R. Sullivan (1939–1968)
John W. Sears (1968–1969)
Thomas S. Eisenstadt (1969–1977)
Dennis J. Kearney (1977–1987)
Robert Rufo (1987–1996)
Andrea Cabral (2002–2013)
Steven W. Tompkins (2013–present)

Geography
It is the second-smallest county in Massachusetts by land area and smallest by total area.

Adjacent counties
Essex County (north)
Norfolk County (south)
Middlesex County (west)

Suffolk County has no land border with Plymouth County to its southeast, but the two counties share a water boundary in the middle of Massachusetts Bay.

National protected areas
Boston African American National Historic Site
Boston Harbor Islands National Recreation Area (part)
Boston National Historical Park

Major highways

Demographics

Of the 292,767 households, 24.4% had children under the age of 18 living with them, 27.1% were married couples living together, 16.3% had a female householder with no husband present, 52.0% were non-families, and 36.3% of all households were made up of individuals. The average household size was 2.30 and the average family size was 3.11. The median age was 31.5 years.

The median income for a household in the county was $50,597 and the median income for a family was $58,127. Males had a median income of $48,887 versus $43,658 for females. The per capita income for the county was $30,720. About 15.7% of families and 20.6% of the population were below the poverty line, including 28.1% of those under age 18 and 19.1% of those age 65 or over.

Ancestry
According to the 2012-2016 American Community Survey 5-Year Estimates, the largest ancestry groups in Suffolk County, Massachusetts are:

Demographic breakdown by town

Income

Data is from the 2007-2011 American Community Survey 5-Year Estimates.

Communities

Boston (traditional county seat)
Chelsea
Revere
Winthrop

Education

Each city has its own school district (including Boston Public Schools, Chelsea Public Schools, Revere Public Schools, and Winthrop Public Schools), which all follow municipal boundaries.

Tertiary institutions in the county include:

 Bay State College
 Benjamin Franklin Institute of Technology
 Berklee College of Music
 Boston Architectural College
 Boston College (eastern side)
 Boston University
 Bunker Hill Community College
 Includes a Chelsea Campus
Cambridge College
Emerson College
 Emmanuel College
 Fisher College
 parts of Harvard University, including Harvard Business School and Harvard Medical School
 Massachusetts College of Art and Design
 Massachusetts College of Pharmacy and Health Sciences 
 MGH Institute of Health Professions
 New England College of Optometry 
 New England Conservatory
 New England Law Boston
 North Bennet Street School
 Northeastern University
 Roxbury Community College
 Saint John's Seminary
 Sattler College
 Simmons University
 Suffolk University
 Tufts University School of Medicine
 University of Massachusetts Boston
 Urban College of Boston 
 Wentworth Institute of Technology

Public library systems in the county include:
 Boston Public Library
 Chelsea Public Library
 Revere Public Library
 Winthrop Public Library and Museum

See also

 List of Massachusetts locations by per capita income
 Registry of Deeds (Massachusetts)
 USS Suffolk County (LST-1173)
 National Register of Historic Places listings in Suffolk County, Massachusetts

References

External links

Suffolk County Sheriff's Department
Suffolk County District Attorney
Suffolk County Registry of Deeds
Walling & Gray. 1871 Map of Boston, Suffolk, County and Nearby Towns Pages 48-49 from the 1871 Atlas of Massachusetts.
National Register of Historic Places listing for Suffolk Co., Massachusetts
Map of cities and towns of Massachusetts 

 

 
Massachusetts counties
Counties in Greater Boston
1643 establishments in Massachusetts
Populated places established in 1643
1999 disestablishments in Massachusetts
Populated places disestablished in 1999